The Hudson Commodore is an automobile that was produced by the Hudson Motor Car Company of Detroit, Michigan between 1941 and 1952. During its time in production, the Commodore was the largest and most luxurious Hudson model.

First generation

1941 
The Commodore Series 12 and Series 14 were the junior models to the Commodore Custom Series 15 and Series 17, and debuted in Hudson's 1941 model line. Commodore Series 12 featured a  I6 engine and the Series 14 models came with a I8, with all built on a  wheelbase, while Commodore Customs utilized on the  wheelbase for Series 15 coupes and a  version for Series 17 sedans. 

The Commodore was powered by Hudson's  I6 producing , or by Hudson's  I8 that produced . Prices listed for the Series 12 coupe started at US$1,028 ($ in  dollars ) to the top level Custom Series 17 Sedan at US$1,537 ($ in  dollars ).

The Commodore series was Hudson's largest model range in its debut year, consisting of sedans, coupes, and convertibles. Hudson used a forward hinged hood that opened from the rear by the windshield with the front end of the hood sliding downward over the grille. Elements of the interior and exterior were styled by Betty Thatcher, "the first woman designer to be employed by a car manufacturer".

1942 
For 1942, the cars received a facelift. This included concealed running boards, modestly enlarged front grilles, and external trim arrangements. Hudson offered an optional "Drive-Master" vacuum assisted clutch with a servo-operated transmission with three modes: "automatic" shifting and clutching, automated clutching only, or fully manual.

The firm promoted its economy over luxury during the shortened model year that ended in January 1942, as U.S. war production accelerated.

Second generation

1946 

Hudson began postwar automobile production on August 30, 1945. Body styles were trimmed to Sedan, Club Coupe, and Convertible. The designs were based on the 1942 models. There were minor cosmetic changes from the pre-war versions with one exception, the car's grille now had a concave center section.

Hudson automobiles were more fully equipped than competitive makes, and all Hudson models received door armrests, twin air-horns, ashtrays, windshield wipers, stop lights, locking glove box, sealed beam headlights, and deep pile carpeting. Commodore and Commodore Customs added foam rubber seat cushions (Hudson was the first automaker to introduce foam seat cushions), door-step courtesy lights, rear armrest (sedans), and gold etched lettering on the dashboard panel.

1947 
Production of the 1947 Hudson Commodore Eight increased to 12,593 from the previous year's 8,193.

Third generation

1948 
Introduced in December 1947, the Hudson Commodore was one of the first new-design postwar cars made. The 1948 model year inaugurated Hudson's trademarked "Monobuilt" construction or "step-down" automobile. The new cars were designed by Frank Spring.

The cars had a light, but strong semi-unit body with a perimeter frame. Because of the encircling frame, passengers stepped down into the vehicles. Hudson's step-down design made the body lower than contemporary cars. It offered passengers the safety of being surrounded by the car's chassis with a lower center of gravity. In addition to the added safety of being surrounded by the car's chassis, the step-down also allowed Hudson to gain weight savings provided through unibody construction, making for a well-performing automobile. The cars featured slab-sided bodies with fully integrated fenders. Brougham and sedans were of a fastback design while convertibles and coupes were notchbacks. A character line ran from the front to back further lowering the car even more visually, so "the new Hudson looked like a dream car straight from the auto show."

In 1948, Commodores came in one series and were available in either I8 or I6 engines. Interiors were upholstered in broadcloth on sedans, and leather on convertibles. Again, Hudson continued to provide numerous standard features that other manufacturers classified as upcharge options. Commodore Eight production rose to 35,315 units.

Sir Vival 

In response to the increasing number of deaths on highways in the United States after World War II, an innovative concept car was designed and built for safety rather than for style or speed. Using two 1948 Hudsons, Walter Jerome, built a hinged two-section car to minimize impact of collisions. Among its many features are a centrally-positioned, raised  turret-shaped driver compartment providing panoramic visibility, as well as safety equipment that would later become standard on production vehicles such as rubber bumpers, seat belts, and side marker lights. Jerome had purchased the two donor Hudsons from Bellingham Motors, a Hudson dealership in Massachusetts, and was planning to build up to a dozen Sir Vivals per year, but only the prototype was completed and in early-1970s, it went back to Bellingham Motors for storage.
With the closing of Bellingham Motors, in 2022 it was sold to Lane Motor Museum which plans to restore it.

1949 

For the 1949 model year, the Commodore line was enlarged to include more luxurious Custom models. As a marketing promotion, Hudson had plastic specialists use scaled-down blueprints to develop transparent models of the Commodore Eight sedan to demonstrate and promote the design and construction of the cars.

1950 
There were only nominal trim changes on the exterior of the cars in successive model years. A new Custom Commodore convertible model debuted in mid-April 1950. This year redesigned the interior and it got a rear split back window.

1951 

In 1951, Hudson introduced a new I6 engine and offered General Motors' Hydra-Matic as an optional transmission. The grille was redesigned from a rather rectangular shape to an oval shape, a design that would carry through to 1953. The grille would be redesigned again in 1954, the last year for the famous aerodynamic Hudson body style which was used from 1948 until 1954.

1952 
In its final year in 1952, the Commodore was split into the Six Series and Eight Series. The exterior received another trim change, but by the end of 1953, the Step-Down styling was beginning to look outdated. Instead of redesigning the aging Hudson models, company President A. E. Barit pushed ahead with the firm's plan for the Jet compact.

Beginning in 1953, Hudson would field only the Hudson Hornet and Hudson Wasp line, as well as introduce the entirely new Hudson Jet compact car line.

Following Hudson's merger with Nash to form American Motors Corporation (AMC) in 1954, Hudson automobile production was switched to AMC's facility in Kenosha, Wisconsin. Following slow sales of the 1955 model year, AMC chose to hand over the Hudson styling contract to Richard Arbib, who created a unique look for the Hudson line based on what he termed as "V-Line" styling. The design failed to attract new customers to Hudson, and production fell even further.

1957 showcar 
In its final year, the Hudson brand was pared down to a single model, the Hudson Hornet in two trim levels, the top-level Custom, and the Super. However, during the show car season, AMC issued a one-off 1957 Hudson Commodore show car that was identical to the production Hornet, but featured gold exterior trim and special upholstery.

References
Inline

General

External links 

 Hudson-Essex-Terraplane Club
 "Hudson Car Club" Hudson enthusiast site at Classiccar
 Hudson-Essex-Terraplane Historical Society
 Hudson Commodore in movies and TV series

Commodore
Rear-wheel-drive vehicles
Coupés
Sedans
Convertibles
1940s cars
1950s cars
Streamline Moderne cars